Renirie Rocks is an elliptical rock outcrop 1.5 nautical miles (2.8 km) long at the west side of the terminus of Gressitt Glacier, 10 nautical miles (18 km) northwest of Morozumi Range. Mapped by United States Geological Survey (USGS) from surveys and U.S. Navy air photos, 1960–63. Named by Advisory Committee on Antarctic Names (US-ACAN) for Jack Renirie, United States Antarctic Research Program (USARP) Public Information Officer at McMurdo Station in at least five austral summer seasons, 1962-63 through 1970–71.
 

Rock formations of Victoria Land
Pennell Coast